Sattva Global City Tech Park (formerly Global Village Tech Park) is a software technology park in Bangalore, India. The park is situated in Rajarajeshwari Nagar off Mysore Road,  behind R.V. College of Engineering. It is about 13 km away from the city railway station and 4 km away from Kengeri railway station. The park is spread over 120 acres with a total built-up area of 3.3 million sq ft. Global Village Tech Park was constructed and owned until 2019 by Café Coffee Day under the brand name Tanglin.

The headquarters of IT services firm Mindtree is located within the park. The tech park's value was estimated at 3,000 crore in 2019. In September 2019, Blackstone Group acquired the tech park from Cafe Coffee Day for 2,800 crore.

References

Buildings and structures in Bangalore
Software technology parks in Bangalore
Special Economic Zones of India